Ulla Steinle is a former West German slalom canoeist who competed in the 1980s.

She won two medals in the K-1 team event at the ICF Canoe Slalom World Championships with a gold in 1987 and a silver in 1985.

References
Overview of athlete's results at CanoeSlalom.net 

West German female canoeists
Living people
Year of birth missing (living people)
Medalists at the ICF Canoe Slalom World Championships